Fairview Township is a township in Jasper County, Iowa, USA.

History
Fairview Township was established in 1846.

References

Townships in Jasper County, Iowa
Townships in Iowa
1846 establishments in Iowa Territory